John Anthony Olszewski Jr. (born September 10, 1982) is an American politician and the current Baltimore County Executive. He previously served two terms in the Maryland House of Delegates representing District 6.

Early life and education

Olszewski was the eldest of three sons born to father John Olszewski, a lobbyist and a former member of the Baltimore County Council from 1998 to 2014, and mother Sherry Olszewski. He was raised in Dundalk, Maryland, and graduated from Sparrows Point High School in 2000.

Following high school, he attended Goucher College, from which he graduated with a bachelor's in political science and American studies. After college, Olszewski pursued a master's in political management from George Washington University, which he obtained in 2006. In 2017, Olszewski earned a doctorate from the University of Maryland, Baltimore County.

Career
Olszewski was appointed to the Baltimore County Board of Education as the student member of the board, serving from 1999 to 2000. He was later elected to a term on the Maryland Democratic State Central Committee, serving from 2002 to 2006. After graduating from Goucher, Olszewski began teaching at Patapsco High School and Center for the Arts for five years becoming a countywide resource teacher for two years.

In the legislature
In June 2006, Olszewski was nominated by the Baltimore County Democratic Central Committee to fill the seat left by the resignation of John S. Arnick, who had resigned to accept an appointment to the Maryland Board of Contract Appeals. Governor Bob Ehrlich appointed Olszewski to the seat on June 10, and was sworn in on June 12. Olszewski was elected to a full four-year term in 2006 and subsequently re-elected in 2010.

In 2011, Olszewski was elected as chairman of the Baltimore County Delegation, making him the youngest person to ever fill that role.

In 2012, Olszewski served as a delegate to the Democratic National Convention, pledged to President Barack Obama.

In July 2013, Olszewski announced that he would run for the Maryland Senate, seeking to succeed Norman R. Stone Jr., who had announced that he would retire at the end of his term in 2014. The district was targeted by the Maryland Republican Party during the 2014 Maryland Senate election following declining union membership in the Dundalk area, and Olszewski specifically was targeted for his vote for Maryland's "Rain Tax". In the general election, Olszewski faced Republican candidate Johnny Ray Salling and unaffiliated candidate Scott Collier. Olszewski was defeated by Salling in the general election by a margin of 851 votes, or by 2.8 percent.

Following his defeat, Olszewski worked as a senior account executive at SAS Institute. He also created a group called A Better Baltimore County to travel across the county and listen to voters' concerns, and worked as a lobbyist in Baltimore's transportation department, promoting issues such as the Baltimore Red Line.

Committee assignments
 Member, Environmental Matters Committee, 2006
 Ways and Means Committee, 2007–2010 (education subcommittee, 2007–2010; revenues subcommittee, 2007–2008; election law subcommittee, 2009–2010)
 Joint Information Technology and Biotechnology Committee, 2011–2014
 Economic Matters Committee, 2011–2015 (property & casualty insurance subcommittee, 2011–2015; public utilities subcommittee, 2011–2015; chair, banking, economic development, science & technology subcommittee, 2014–2015)

Baltimore County Executive
In April 2017, Dundalk Eagle reported that Olszewski was considering a run for Baltimore County Executive, seeking to succeed Kevin Kamenetz, who was term-limited. On June 27, 2017, Olszewski announced his candidacy in the 2018 Baltimore County Executive election. In the Democratic primary, he faced state senator James Brochin, county councilwoman Vicki Almond, and Kevin Francis Marron. He received endorsements from The Baltimore Sun, state delegate Stephen W. Lafferty, the Baltimore-D.C. Building Trades Unions, and former governor Martin O'Malley. Olszewski won the Democratic primary in June 2018, edging out state senator James Brochin by nine votes. Following a recount, Olszewski's lead over Brochin expanded to 17 votes.

In the general election, Olszewski faced former Republican state delegate Alfred W. Redmer Jr., who sought to tie Olszewski to Democratic gubernatorial nominee Ben Jealous. Olszewski re-positioned himself from being a "progressive Democrat" to pitching a message of bipartisanship. Olszewski defeated Redmer in the general election on November 6, 2018, receiving 57.8 percent of the vote to Redmer's 42 percent.

Olszewski was sworn in as Baltimore County Executive on December 3, 2018. He was subsequently re-elected in 2022.

Controversy
In July 2021, Olszewski proposed legislation to create a board consisting of political appointees to oversee the Baltimore County inspector general, an office which he created. This proposal was later dropped following backlash over the makeup of the board. In October 2021, Olszewski created an independent Commission on Ethics and Accountability to review the county's ethics laws and examine the office of the inspector general. In April 2022, the Baltimore County Council voted 6-1 to approve paying a contractor $99,000 to help the commission. The commission began its work on June 5, 2022, and released its final report on February 17, 2023, which provided several recommended changes for the office, but was not in favor of creating an oversight board of the county inspector general.

In December 2021, the Baltimore County inspector general opened an investigation into Olszewski's aides intervening to approve the application of David Cordish, a wealthy Baltimore County developer, for an indoor "tennis barn" next to his Greenspring Valley home. Cordish was initially instructed to schedule an administrative hearing for variances that would allow for construction to break ground for the tennis barn, as the project was deemed to be too big to be an "accessory structure" for his residence. However, then-county permit director Mike Millanoff authorized Cordish's project to move forward without an administrative hearing. In July 2022, the Baltimore County inspector general found that it appeared developer David Cordish was given "preferential treatment" to build an indoor tennis facility when key zoning approvals were given, despite the opposition from some within the permits department. Cordish's "tennis barn" was never built.

Political positions
While in the Maryland House of Delegates, Olszewski was described as a blue-collar, pro-labor but socially conservative Democrat. During his county executive campaign, he described himself as being both a "principled Democrat" as well as a "progressive Democrat".

COVID-19 pandemic

On March 12, 2020, the Maryland Department of Health confirmed the first case of COVID-19 in Baltimore County, Maryland. Later that night, Olszewski announced that the county would close all senior centers and would immediately suspend all nonessential out-of-state travel for employees. On March 24, Olszewski requested support from the Maryland National Guard to provide humanitarian and emergency management assistance in Baltimore County. On April 12, after President Donald Trump ordered General Motors to begin manufacturing ventilators for COVID-19 patients at auto plants, Olszewski asked Trump to reopen its shuttered plant at White Marsh, Maryland for the same purpose.

After Governor Hogan announced the start of the state's partial reopening on May 13, Olszewski said they would take "a close look" at Hogan's actions and determine their course in the next 24 hours. At the time, Baltimore County had 12 percent of the state's case count. On May 14, Olszewski said that most restrictions would remain in effect. On May 20, Olszewski signed onto a letter expressing concern about the consequences of Hogan's partial reopening and asking for guidance from the administration as they decided how to proceed. He also announced that appointment-free drive-through testing would be available at the Maryland State Fairgrounds. On June 10, after Governor Hogan announced the next stage of the state's partial reopening, Olszewski said he would review the governor's executive order before deciding whether to follow it. 

In July 2020, as hospitalization rates began to rise again, Olszewski issued a new indoor mask mandate and chastised Governor Hogan for being "absent" from weekly briefings with Maryland's eight largest counties and Baltimore City, urging him to return to their weekly dialogue. He also signed onto a letter demanding that Hogan adopt a mail-in election format for the November 3 general election. In September, Olszewski proposed allocating $3 million in federal relief funds for the county's rental assistance program to help alleviate the amount of evictions following the end of the state's eviction moratorium. In November, Olszewski issued an executive order banning social gatherings larger than 25 people and formed a task force to inspect more than 7,000 establishments in Baltimore County to ensure that they were complying with COVID-19 orders. In December, Olszewski signed an executive order blocking restaurants from collecting more than 15 percent in commission from food delivery app orders.

In January 2021, Olszewski opened the county's first vaccination clinic at the Maryland State Fairgrounds. Governor Hogan called the Fairgrounds vaccination clinic the "best operation in the state" and later announced in March 2021 that it would be converted to a mass vaccination site in partnership with Baltimore County. In June 2021, after Governor Hogan lifted most of the state's COVID-19 restrictions, Olszewski said he would allow the county's state of emergency declaration to expire on July 9. In August 2021, Olszewski issued a new indoor masking requirement and declared a new state of emergency following a spike in cases of the Delta variant. In December 2021, Olszewski declared a new state of emergency and again required indoor masking amid a surge in cases of the omicron variant. On February 14, 2022, Olszewski announced that the county would lift its indoor mask mandate and end required COVID-19 testing for unvaccinated employees.

Crime
In February 2023, following the shooting death of 17-year-old Tre'shaun Harmon in Towson, Maryland, Olszewski pledged additional security measures in downtown Towson.

Education
In 2000, Olszewski lobbied for a bill that would provide the student member of the Baltimore County Board of Education with full voting rights.

During his county executive campaign, Olszewski said he would provide $2 billion toward school renovations, raise teacher salaries by 20 percent, expand tuition-free community college, and creating universal pre-kindergarten. He said he would fund these policies by scaling back the county's $300 million program to buy laptops and tablets for all students and through economic growth and more efficient tax spending.

Olszewski supports the Blueprint for Maryland's Future, a sweeping education reform package passed by the Maryland General Assembly in 2020.

In January 2020, Olszewski testified in support of the Built to Learn Act, a bill that would allow the Maryland Stadium Authority to issue up to $2.2 billion in bonds to pay for school construction projects.

Environment
During the 2007 legislative session, following the proposal of a liquefied natural gas in Dundalk, Maryland by AES Corporation, Olszewski introduced a bill that would impose an impact fee on LNG-related development in Baltimore County.

In 2013, Olszewski introduced a bill that would remove subsidies going to facilities that produce black liquor, redirecting it toward wind, solar, and other renewable energy sources. The bill was rejected by the House Economic Matters Committee by a 11-8 vote, one vote short of the 12-vote majority needed to pass.

During his 2018 county executive campaign, Olszewski pledged to create a timeline for county government entirely to renewable energy sources. In 2019, he created a new "chief sustainability officer" position within the government. In February 2021, Olszewski spoke in support of a bill that would establish an Office on Climate Change within the governor's office to combat climate change. In April 2021, Olszewski set a goal of using 100 percent renewable energy for government operations by 2026.

In November 2021, Olszewski unveiled a planting program that would offer free trees to low-income, densely populated neighborhoods to reduce "heat islands" in urban parts of the county.

In January 2023, Olszewski and Baltimore mayor Brandon Scott said they supported a bill that would establish the Task Force on Regional Water and Wastewater to modernize the governance of the Back River Wastewater Treatment Plant, the Baltimore-area region's water and wastewater utility.

In February 2023, Olszewski signed into law the Bring Your Own Bag Act, which incentivizes shoppers to bring their own bags when shopping for groceries by banning plastic bags at large retailers and charge customers $0.05 per paper bag in checkout.

Gun control
In 2009, Olszewski voted against a bill that would prohibit accused domestic abusers from owning firearms, but for a bill that prohibited convicted domestic abusers from owning firearms. In 2013, he voted against a bill that would have banned assault weapons in Maryland. In 2014, the National Rifle Association gave Olszewski a 93 percent rating. Olszewski later called this vote a "mistake", saying that it was "a vote I've changed my mind on. I am focused on the future and the safety of our children."

During the 2018 legislative session, Olszewski testified in support of "Leia's law", a bill that would make it a misdemeanor in Baltimore County to leave a loaded gun where a child aged 16 or 17 could access it.

In November 2019, Olszewski proposed legislation that would require gun shops to install stronger security measures to protect firearms from burglaries. In March 2022, Olszewski testified in support of a bill that would require gun shops to implement minimum security requirements to prevent gun theft.

Health care
In March 2019, Olszewski appeared in an ad to support a bill establishing the Prescription Drug Affordability Board, a state agency to negotiate prescription drug prices. During the 2021 legislative session, Olszewski urged the Maryland General Assembly to override Governor Larry Hogan's of a bill establishing a permanent funding source for the Prescription Drug Affordability Board.

Housing
During his county executive campaign, Olszewski said he supported the construction of Towson Row, a proposed mixed-use development in central Towson, Maryland, but said he opposed using taxpayer dollars to pay for the project.

In October 2018, Olszewski said he supported Baltimore County's agreement with the federal government to improve access to affordable housing, which would see the construction of 1,000 affordable housing units over 10 years. He also framed his support of the agreement as a fight against discrimination. During the 2019 legislative session, Olszewski said he supported a bill that would allow Baltimore County to impose impact fees onto developers to pay for roads and schools impacted by specific developments. Olszewski later signed a bill into law imposing impact fees onto developers starting July 2020.

During the 2020 legislative session, Olszewski testified in support of the Housing Opportunities Made Equal (HOME) Act, a bill that would make it illegal for landlords to discriminate against prospective renters based on their lawful source of income.

In May 2021, Olszewski signed a bill creating the Baltimore County Department of Housing and Community Development.

Minimum wage

During his county executive campaign, Olszewski said he supported raising the Maryland minimum wage to $15 an hour, saying that it would "give people a chance to earn a decent wage". During the 2019 legislative session, Olszewski testified in support of a bill that would raise the state's minimum wage to $15 an hour by 2026. In October 2020, Olszewski proposed legislation that would provide county workers with prevailing wages. In February 2023, Olszewski testified in support of the Fair Wage Act, a bill that would accelerate the state's incremental minimum wage increase to be $15 an hour by 2023 and index future increases to the consumer price index.

Paid sick leave
During the 2013 legislative session, Olszewski introduced the Maryland Paid Sick and Safe Leave Act, a bill that would require employers to offer paid sick leave to their workers.

Social issues
Olszewski was seen as a key vote on the Civil Marriage Protection Act in 2011 and 2012. During the 2011 legislative session, Olszewski introduced an amendment to the Civil Marriage Protection Act that specified what religious programs could refuse providing services to same-sex couples. During the 2012 legislative session, Olszewski expressed concerns about the legislation, mainly on how it would impact churches, mosques, and synagogues whose members abhor same-sex marriages, and said that he sought protections beyond simply letting religious institutions bar same-sex marriage ceremonies. On February 16, 2012, Olszewski said he would vote for the Civil Marriage Protection Act, saying it would be a "disgrace" to go another year without giving Marylanders "equal protection". The bill passed the Maryland House of Delegates on February 18 by a vote of 72-67.

While in the House of Delegates, Olszewski received an overall approval rating of 30 percent from the Maryland Right to Life, which opposes abortion. When asked in 2010 if he identified as being pro-choice or pro-life, Olszewski said, "I believe that we must do all that we can do prevent unplanned pregnancies. Rather than focusing energies in an argument about 'pro life/pro choice' we should focus instead on eliminating the need for that choice in the first place." In 2014, he voted for a bill that would eliminate taxpayer funding of third-trimester abortions. In June 2022, Olszewski condemned the U.S. Supreme Court's ruling in Dobbs v. Jackson Women's Health Organization. In July 2022, Olszewski said that Baltimore County officials would not cooperate with attempts to prosecute people who cross state lines to receive an abortion.

During his county executive campaign, Olszewski said he supported establishing a public campaign finance system for Baltimore County elections. In January 2019, he proposed an ethics reform package that included the creation of a public campaign finance system and the Office of Ethics and Accountability, prohibiting outgoing county officials from lobbying county government, and posting all lobbyist registrations online. Voters approved the charter amendment creating the public campaign financing system during the 2020 elections, with 57.1 percent of voters supporting the measure. In March 2021, Olszewski appointed a work group to make recommendations on how the county's public campaign financing system would work. The work group released its findings in November 2021, which were implemented through the Fair Election Fund. In February 2022, Olszewski testified in support of a bill that would allow local governments to expand public campaign finance programs to include more elected offices.

In January 2019, Olszewski denounced the partial government shutdown and called on federal leaders to end the impasse.

In March 2022, after the Baltimore County NAACP filed a lawsuit against the county's councilmanic redistricting plan for not having enough majority-Black districts, Olszewski called on councilmembers to pass a new map that does so.

In February 2023, Olszewski said he supported a bill to move Maryland's 2024 primary date from April 23 to April 16, 2024, citing that April 23 was the first full day of Passover.

Transportation
Olszewski supports the revival of the Baltimore Red Line, calling Governor Larry Hogan's decision to kill the proposed transit line "short-sighted".

In September 2020, Olszewski signed a letter opposing proposals by the Maryland Transit Administration to dramatically cut bus and rail services in the Baltimore region in 2021 following a historic decline in ridership and revenues. Later that month, he praised the MTA's decision not to pursue cuts to Baltimore-area bus services. In September 2021, Olszewski accused the Maryland Department of Transportation of neglecting Baltimore County's needs and called for "more sustained support and partnership" from state budgeteers.

Personal life

Olszewski is married to Marisa Azzone, the current environmental policy manager for the Maryland League of Conservation Voters, whom he had met while attending Goucher College. Together, they have a daughter and live in Sparrows Point, Maryland.

Olszewski is a Methodist and attends Lovely Lane United Methodist Church in Baltimore, Maryland.

Electoral history

References

External links

 Official website
 Campaign website
 

1982 births
21st-century American politicians
Baltimore County Executives
Democratic Party members of the Maryland House of Delegates
Goucher College alumni
Living people
People from Dundalk, Maryland
Politicians from Baltimore
Schoolteachers from Maryland
The Graduate School of Political Management alumni
University of Maryland, Baltimore County alumni